Kuninga may refer to several places in Estonia:

Kuninga, Pärnu County, village in Halinga Parish, Pärnu County
Kuninga, Viljandi County, village in Kõpu Parish, Viljandi County